Peter McAleese (born 7 September 1942) is a Scottish former soldier and mercenary.

He served in the British Army's Parachute Regiment and Special Air Service (SAS), the Rhodesian Special Air Service and British South Africa Police, and South Africa's 44 Parachute Brigade. As a mercenary or contractor, he worked in countries including South Africa, Angola, Colombia, Russia, Algeria and Iraq.

He is the author of the book No Mean Soldier.

Early life
Peter McAleese was born into a Catholic family of Irish descent in Glasgow, Scotland, within sight of Barlinnie Prison, and spent his childhood years in the city's Shettleston district. Growing up he was often beaten by his father, who had served in the military and had a reputation for being an aggressive fighting man, which contributed to Peter's use of fighting to solve conflicts later in life.

Military career
McAleese enlisted with the British Army's Parachute Regiment in Aberdeen in 1960 at the age of 17. After basic training at the Parachute Regiment's Aldershot depot, he was assigned to the 1st Battalion, Parachute Regiment's mortar platoon. In 1962 McAleese transferred to 'D' Squadron, 22 SAS, where he served with the squadron's Mobility troop in Aden. After a few months he was returned to unit from the SAS for disciplinary reasons, re-joining 1 Para, where he was posted to Bahrain and Cyprus in 1962–64. In 1964 he re-joined the SAS and served with 'D' Squadron's 16 (Air) Troop in Borneo and in the Aden Emergency. In 1968 he was again returned to the Parachute Regiment by the SAS for disciplinary offences related to violent disorder, rejoining 1 Para, which he served with from 1968 to 1969 as a sergeant-instructor. In 1969 McAleese resigned from the British Army.

He served three prison sentences in the early 1970s following convictions for violence and was incarcerated at HMP Gloucester. On release from prison for the third time he left the United Kingdom for Africa, where he was a mercenary soldier in the Angolan Civil War for several months in 1976, fighting for the National Liberation Front of Angola, assuming command of the formation after the capture of Costas Georgiou.

In early 1977,  McAleese moved to Rhodesia and enlisted with the Rhodesian Special Air Service, being assigned to its 'A' Squadron, fighting in the Rhodesian Bush War with the rank of a non-commissioned officer. In 1979 he joined the British South Africa Police's Special Branch operating in South Rhodesia. 
After the fall of Rhodesia in 1980, he enlisted with the South African Defence Force's 44 Parachute Brigade, where he served as a Warrant Officer Class 2 to 1984. He assisted with the creation of a new pathfinder reconnaissance unit, and took part in the South African Border War.

Security contracting career
In the mid-1980s McAleese set up a family home in Pretoria, and became an employee of the COIN Security Group, a military/police private contractor based in South Africa. After a near-death parachuting display accident, he moved back to live in the United Kingdom. At the end of the 1980s he spent two years as a security contractor working for the government forces in the Colombian Conflict. In the mid-1990s he worked in Moscow as a bodyguard training instructor, and undertook security work in Algeria and Iraq for several years.

McAleese was contracted in 1989 by the Colombian Cali Cartel to assassinate their rival, Pablo Escobar. He and his team of mercenaries failed in their attempt, which was the subject of the 2021 UK documentary film Killing Escobar. Filmed interviews with him and some of his colleagues form the core of the narrative.

Retirement
In his latter years McAleese was a pub landlord in England. In 1993 he published his memoir, entitled No Mean Soldier, which has been reprinted several times.

Publications

McAleese, Peter (2015). Beyond No Mean Soldier (an updated and more detailed revision of No Mean Soldier).  Helion & Co., Ltd.  .

References

External links

https://www.petermcaleese.com/
Personal website 
Training Russian Bodyguards
Orion Books author profile

British Parachute Regiment soldiers
British mercenaries
Foreign volunteers in the Rhodesian Security Forces
Rhodesian Special Air Service personnel
South African military personnel of the Border War
People of the Angolan Civil War
Special Air Service soldiers
Military personnel from Glasgow
1942 births
Living people
British South Africa Police officers